Anne Anlin Cheng is an American literary scholar and cultural theorist, known for her extensive writings on the intersections of race, gender, aesthetics, American literature, psychoanalysis, Asian American studies, and Black studies. She is currently a Professor of English and American Studies at Princeton University.

Cheng was born in Taipei, Taiwan, and immigrated to the United States at the age of twelve. Cheng graduated with a Bachelor's degree in English and Creative Writing from Princeton University in 1985, earned her Master's in English and Creative Writing at Stanford University in 1987, and received a PhD in Comparative Literature at University California, Berkeley in 1994.

Cheng's first book, The Melancholy of Race (2001), examined melancholia as the very process that forms racial identity the United States. The book weaves a thread between historic moments in the nation's legal system such as the Brown v. Board of Education US Supreme Court case, literature such as Maxine Hong Kingston's Woman Warrior, film such as Flower Drum Song, and conceptual artists such as Theresa Hak Kyung Cha.

Her research often returns to some of the most famous yet misunderstood figures of the 20th century, such as Anna May Wong and Josephine Baker. Rather than characterize these highly visible "race beauties" as simply empowering or stereotypical, as more popular narratives of racial progress and uplift demand, Cheng asks readers to consider them as "severely compromised" and highly fabricated, aestheticized surfaces that trouble our sense of the human. Benjamin Kahan, Assistant Professor of English and Women's and Gender Studies at Louisiana State University, wrote of her second book Second Skin: Josephine Baker & the Modern Surface, "it might be easy to miss that this is a monumental work of scholarship, making major interventions into critical race theory and modernist studies."

Her most recent book, Ornamentalism (2019), aims to formulate the very first "feminist theory for the yellow woman." By centering her critique on the myth of the "yellow" woman rather than more politically correct, ameliorative terms such as Asian-American, Cheng hoped to address the painful and unspoken ways in which Asiatic femininity is constructed rather than necessarily claimed. In a review of the book, scholar Michelle Lee writes, "building on writers such as Mel Chen and Fred Moten, Cheng’s logic of ornamentalism suggests that objectification is no longer the threatening process which removes subjecthood, but rather prioritizes how objects become animated, highlighting how performances of liberation emerge from inorganic, inanimate places." Cheng's insights on the limitations of the subject-object binary in Ornamentalism continues lines of inquiry seen in Second Skin, radically disrupting familiar arguments that the Western gaze has reduced racialized subjects to mere fetish. In an interview with Shivani Radhakrishnan for BOMB Magazine, Cheng says, "I think there is obviously a very well-developed critique of the ways in which Western modernists have appropriated racial otherness in their aesthetics. And they’re right. Except, oftentimes the way that critique is offered ends up reproducing a sort of subject-object divide, so that the Western is a subject of intellectual intent who then takes advantage of the racial other who is an object and ready to be used in this way."

Taken together, Cheng's works build upon renowned race theorists such as Saidiya Hartman, Gayatri Spivak, Frantz Fanon, and Hortense Spillers to place Asian-American studies firmly within the discussion surrounding racial formation in the United States, as seen in her previous books such as The Melancholy of Race (2001) and critical reviews for the Los Angeles Review of Books that have covered Ghost in the Shell, Crazy Rich Asians, Minari, and Mulan. Other essays of hers can be found in The Atlantic, The Nation, Hyperallergic, and Huffington Post.

Political activism

Comments on Stop Asian Hate 
Anne Anlin Cheng was vocal during the 2021 Atlanta Spa Shootings, which targeted Asian women and was motivated by sexual desire. For The New York Times, she penned an op-ed that particularly pushed back on popular assumptions that Asian Americans experienced injuries that were too privileged to warrant serious attention, writing, "There is something wrong with the way Americans think about who deserves social justice — as though attention to nonwhite groups, their histories and conditions, is only as pressing as the injuries that they have suffered." For CBS news, she expanded on this, emphasizing that “Mild forms of racist, sexist harassment is on a continuum of what we saw in Atlanta last week, a very lethal expression of that.”

Selected publications 

 Ornamentalism (Oxford University Press, 2019)
 Second Skin: Josephine Baker & the Modern Surface (Oxford University Press, 2011)
 The Melancholy of Race: Psychoanalysis, Assimilation, and Hidden Grief (Oxford University Press, 2001)

References 

Living people
Year of birth missing (living people)
Writers from Taipei
American women historians
21st-century American women writers
Princeton University alumni
21st-century American historians
Taiwanese emigrants to the United States
American writers of Taiwanese descent
Stanford University alumni
University of California, Berkeley alumni